Namangan is a district of Namangan Region in Uzbekistan. The capital lies at the town Toshbuloq. Its area is 203 km2. Its population is 179,800 (2021 est.).

The district consists of 5 urban-type settlements (Toshbuloq, Navbahor, Qumqoʻrgʻon, Shoʻrqoʻrgʻon, Mirishkor) and 10 rural communities.

References 

Districts of Uzbekistan
Namangan Region